Risto Kiiskinen (born 20 July 1956) is a Finnish cross-country skier. He competed in the men's 15 kilometre event at the 1976 Winter Olympics.

Cross-country skiing results

Olympic Games

World Championships

References

External links
 

1956 births
Living people
Finnish male cross-country skiers
Olympic cross-country skiers of Finland
Cross-country skiers at the 1976 Winter Olympics
People from Lieksa
Sportspeople from North Karelia